Hussain bin Ibrahim Al Hammadi (Arabic: حسين بن إبراهيم الحمادي; born 1966) is the Minister of Education of the United Arab Emirates. He has held this position since July 4, 2014.

Education 
In 1989, he graduated with a Bachelor of Science degree in Aeronautical Engineering from Embry-Riddle Aeronautical University in Florida, United States of America.

Career 
Al Hammadi joined the UAE Armed Forces in 1984. After completing his B.Sc. in the USA, he returned to the UAE.

In 2006, he was appointed as chairman and chief executive officer of Emirates Advanced Investments (EAI). He chaired the National Institute for Health Specialties and headed the Higher Education and Scientific Research Coordination Council.

He joined the UAE Cabinet in 2014 as Education Minister, and in 2016, the Ministries of Education and Higher Education were combined to form the Ministry of Education. During the COVID-19 pandemic, his ministry implemented remote learning and a hybrid model of education in UAE public schools.

He is the chairman of the National Committee for Education, Culture and Science at the Emirati Ministry of Education, chairman of the Boards of Trustees of the Institute of Applied Technology (IAT), the Abu Dhabi Institute of Vocational Education and Training (ADVETI), and the Hamdan bin Rashid Al Maktoum Award for Distinguished Academic Performance, chairman of the Board of Directors of the Federal Authority for Government Human Resources (FAHR), and member of the Boards of Directors of Khalifa University of Science, Technology and Research (KUSTAR) and the Khalifa Award for Education.

See also 

 Cabinet of the United Arab Emirates 
 List of Emiratis

References 

Living people
1966 births
Government ministers of the United Arab Emirates